EBCO may refer to:

 Estradiol benzoate cyclooctenyl ether, a synthetic estrogen
 European Bureau for Conscientious Objection, an international peace organisation
 Ebco Industries, a manufacturing company